28 Reasons is the debut extended play by South Korean singer Seulgi. It was released by SM Entertainment on October 4, 2022, and contains six tracks, including the  lead single of the same name.

Background
On September 6, 2022, SM Entertainment announced that Seulgi would be releasing her first solo album in October 2022. On September 13, it was announced that she will be releasing her first extended play titled 28 Reasons on October 4. On the same day, an album trailer video was released. On September 19, the promotional schedule was released. On September 26, a mood sampler video was released through Red Velvet's social media accounts. On October 3, the music video teaser for lead single "28 Reasons" was released.

Composition
The EP contains a total of 6 songs. The lead single, "28 Reasons", is described as a dance-pop song characterized by groovy and heavy bass sounds and featuring a whistling sound. The lyrics depict a character who is both "good and evil" and the way this affects the relationship they're in. 

"Dead Man Runnin" is a R&B, dance-pop song featuring "energetic" drums, synth sounds, and bass drops. Written by Seulgi, in the lyrics she expresses her anxiety and the emptiness she felt when she was hurt in the past. In an interview with Rolling Stone Seulgi explained "It was a song that makes you feel like a villain will appear. How will the villain appear? I made up that narrative and thought of someone who would want to destroy the world. These are thoughts we don’t normally have" Furthermore she added: "Joker, in particular. He was hurt and abused before he turned into a villain. When you hear the song, I think those emotions come to the surface."

"Bad Boy, Sad Girl" is a mid-tempo R&B song that features a "bouncing" piano. a collaboration with rapper Be'O, where he participated in rap making. "Anywhere but Home" is a "disco-style" song with elements of R&B and dance-pop, the lyrics about taking a ride to "unfamiliar place" on a sleepless night. "Los Angeles", is an EDM song with a bold drop of techno sound. Lyrically, it describes the scenery of the "City of Angels", and the feeling of excitement and anticipation of finding a new dream in an "unfamiliar place". "Crown" is an R&B dance-pop track with heavy drum and synth melody.

Promotion
On October 4, 2022, Seulgi held a live broadcast on YouTube and TikTok to commemorate the release of 28 Reasons.

Critical reception

Rhian Daly of NME  described the EP in the 5-star review as "cohesive, through dark steps that tie together, that drawing on different aspects of R&B and dance-influenced pop". He emphasizes that "each incorporating opposing forces of light and dark, as hinted in the good vs evil narrative that coursed through the teaser content for this record".

Commercial performance
28 Reasons debuted at number three on the Circle Album Chart in the chart issue dated October 2–8, 2022, with 171,262 copies sold. In Japan, the EP debuted at number 13 on the Oricon Albums Chart in the chart issue dated October 17–23 , 2022, with 4,156 copies sold. On the Billboard Japan Hot Albums, it debuted at number nine in the chart issue dated October 26, 2022.

Track listing

Credits and personnel 
Credits adapted from album's liner notes.

Studio 

 SM Booming System – recording, mixing, engineered for mix, digital editing 
 SM Big Shot Studio – recording , mixing , digital editing  
 SM Yellow Tail Studio – recording 
 SM Blue Ocean Studio – mixing 
 SM Blue Cup Studio – mixing 
 SM Lvyin Studio – recording , mixing , digital editing , engineered for mix 
 SM Ssam Studio – recording 
 SM Starlight Studio – digital editing 
 Sonic Korea – mastering 
 821 Sound Mastering – mastering 
 Doobdoob Studio – digital editing 
 BPM Studio – digital editing 
 Sound Pool Studio – digital editing

Personnel 

 SM Entertainment – executive producer
 Lee Soo-man – producer
 Lee Sung-soo – production director, executive supervisor
 Tak Young-jun – executive supervisor
 Seulgi – vocals , background vocals , lyrics 
 Yoo Young-jin – producer , lyrics, composition, arrangement, vocal director, background vocals, recording, mixing, engineered for mix, digital editing , music and sound supervisor 
 Kriz – composition , vocal director , background vocals 
 January 8th – lyrics 
 Jeon Ji-eun – lyrics 
 Jo Yoon-kyung – lyrics 
 Sean Kennedy – composition 
 Johan Fransson – composition, arrangement 
 Henrik Goranson – composition, arrangement 
 Imlay – arrangement 
 Yaakov "Yash" Gruzman – producer , composition, arrangement, drums, keyboards, synthesizer, programming, background vocals 
 Shaun Frank – composition 
 Audra Mae – composition 
 danke (Lalala Studio) – lyrics 
 Be'O – lyrics, composition, background vocals 
 Dino Medanhodžić – producer , composition, arrangement, background vocals 
 Johanna Jansson – composition, background vocals 
 Ryan S. Jhun – producer , composition, arrangement 
 Seo Mi-rae (ButterFly) – vocal director 
 Seo Ji-eum – lyrics 
 Emile Ghantous – producer , composition, arrangement 
 Leslie Johnson – producer , composition, arrangement 
 Josh Goode – composition 
 Sofia Quinn – composition 
 Carly Gibert – composition, background vocals 
 Lee Joo-myung – vocal director 
 Jung Il-li – lyrics 
 Jennifer Decilveo – producer , composition, arrangement 
 Oliver Goldstein – composition 
 Wens – composition, background vocals 
 Justin Seiser – producer , composition, arrangement 
 Kang Min-seo – vocal director 
 Kim Su-ji (Lalala Studio) – lyrics 
 Lee Ji-yoon (Jam Factory) – lyrics 
 Hitimpulse – producer , composition, arrangement 
 Violet Skies – composition, arrangement 
 Ilira Gashi – composition, arrangement 
 Kim Tae-woo – background vocals 
 Kenzie – vocal director 
 Lee Min-gyu – recording , mixing , digital editing 
 Lee Ji-hong – recording , mixing , digital editing , engineered for mix 
 Noh Min-ji – recording 
 Kang Eun-ji – recording 
 Kim Cheol-sun – mixing 
 Jung Eui-seok – mixing 
 Shin Soo-min – mastering assistant 
 Jeon Hoon – mastering 
 Kwon Nam-woo – mastering 
 Eugene Kwon – digital editing 
 Jung Woo-young – digital editing 
 Min Sung-soo – digital editing 
 Jung Yu-ra – digital editing 
 Jung Ho-jin – digital editing

Charts

Weekly charts

Monthly charts

Year-end charts

Release history

References

2022 debut EPs
Korean-language EPs
SM Entertainment EPs